United Nations Security Council resolution 817, adopted unanimously on 7 April 1993, after examining the application of the Republic of Macedonia for membership in the United Nations, the council recommended to the General Assembly that Macedonia be admitted to membership in the United Nations, this State being provisionally referred to for all purposes within the United Nations as "the former Yugoslav Republic of Macedonia" pending settlement of the difference that has arisen over the name of the State.

However, the council also noted the differences that had arisen over the name of the state and welcomed the co-chairmen of the Steering Committee of the International Conference on the Former Yugoslavia for their efforts to settle the dispute. For this reason, the council decided that the state should be admitted under the provisional name of the "former Yugoslav Republic of Macedonia" until the dispute was resolved.

See also
 List of United Nations member states
 List of United Nations Security Council Resolutions 801 to 900 (1993–1994)
 Macedonia (terminology)
 United Nations Security Council Resolution 845

References

External links
 
Text of the Resolution at undocs.org (visit contents page first and accept cookies).

 0817
1993 in the Republic of Macedonia
 0817
 0817
 0817
April 1993 events